Patrick Joseph Murphy (born August 24, 1959) is an American politician who served as Iowa State Representative from the 99th District and Speaker of the Iowa House of Representatives; Murphy was also the Democratic nominee for Iowa's 1st congressional district in 2014. He also previously served as Minority Leader from 2003 to 2007. Murphy is a Democrat and served in the Iowa House after winning a special election in 1989.<ref>{{cite web |url=http://www.iowahousedemocrats.org/2007/06/speaker-of-house-pat-murphy.html |title=."/>  He received his BA from Loras College.

Pat Murphy served 12 terms in the Iowa House of Representatives.  He served on the Appropriations, Labor and Transportation committees.  Throughout his term in the House, he had worked on numerous issues related to human services, health care, and appropriations.  As House Speaker he has championed a number of Democratic priorities including raising the minimum wage, increasing K-12 teacher salaries to the national average, expanding preschool programs, promoting "green jobs" by encouraging the expansion of Iowa's renewable energy industry, expanding health insurance coverage, and supporting Iowa's veterans.

Murphy was re-elected in 2012 with 10,098 votes.

2014 U.S. Congressional campaign

On June 3, Murphy won the Democratic nomination in a five-way primary to replace four-term Democrat Bruce Braley, who was giving up the seat to run for United States Senate. Murphy lost to Republican nominee and fellow Dubuque resident Rod Blum in the general election on November 4. Murphy was succeeded in the state house by one of his former pages, Abby Finkenauer, who would go on to unseat Blum in 2018.

References

External links
Representative Pat Murphy at the Iowa General Assembly site
Pat Murphy for Congress official campaign site
 

Living people
1959 births
Loras College alumni
Speakers of the Iowa House of Representatives
Democratic Party members of the Iowa House of Representatives
Politicians from Dubuque, Iowa